This is a list of notable individuals and events related to Turkmenistan in 2023.

Incumbents

Events

Ongoing 
Ongoing: COVID-19 pandemic in Turkmenistan

2023 Turkmen parliamentary election

Deaths 
6 January – Omar Berdiýew, 43, footballer (Esil Bogatyr, Dinamo Samarqand, national team).

See also 

 Outline of Turkmenistan
 Index of Turkmenistan-related articles
 List of Turkmenistan-related topics
 History of Turkmenistan

References

Further reading 

 
 

 
2020s in Turkmenistan
Years of the 21st century in Turkmenistan
Turkmenistan
Turkmenistan